22 teams took part in the league with FC Spartak Moscow winning the championship.

Round 1

Group A

Table

Results

Group B

Table

Results

Round 2

Places 1–12

Table

Results

Places 13–22

Table

Results

Top scorers
17 goals
 Mikhail Mustygin (Belarus Minsk)

16 goals
 Boris Kazakov (Krylia Sovetov Kuybyshev)
 Eduard Markarov (Neftyanik Baku)
 Yuri Sevidov (Spartak Moscow)

15 goals
 Gennadi Gusarov (Torpedo Moscow)

14 goals
 Gennadi Matveyev (SKA Rostov-on-Don)

13 goals
 Zaur Kaloyev (Dinamo Tbilisi)
 Nemesio Pozuelo (Torpedo Moscow)

12 goals
 Lev Burchalkin (Zenit Leningrad)

11 goals
 Andriy Biba (Dynamo Kyiv)
 Oleg Kopayev (SKA Rostov-on-Don)
 Vitali Savelyev (Shakhtyor Donetsk)

References

 Soviet Union - List of final tables (RSSSF)

Soviet Top League seasons
1
Soviet
Soviet